Euliphyra is a genus of butterflies in the family Lycaenidae.

Species
Euliphyra hewitsoni Aurivillius, 1899
Euliphyra leucyania (Hewitson, 1874)
Euliphyra mirifica Holland, 1890

References

Miletinae
Lycaenidae genera